Meiler de Bermingham was a Norman-Irish lord who died in 1529.

Meiler was the last lord of Athenry before contact was resumed with the government in Dublin.

References
 The Abbey of Athenry, Martin J. Blake, Journal of the Galway Archaeological and Historical Society, volume II, part ii, 1902
 The Birmingham family of Athenry, H. T. Knox, J.G.A.H.S., volume ten, numbers iii and iv, 1916-17.
 The Birmingham chalice, J. Rabbitte, J.G.A.H.S., volume 17, i and ii, 1936-27
 The Second Battle of Athenry, Adrian James Martyn, East Galway News & Views, September 2008-April 2009

External links
 Medieval Ireland: an encyclopedia
 Edenderry Historical Society
 The Fitzgeralds: Barons of Offaly

People from County Galway
Barons Athenry
Meiler